A dog watch is a work shift, also known as a "watch", in a maritime watch system that is half the length of a standard watch period. This is typically formed by splitting a single four-hour watch period between 16:00 and 20:00 (4 pm and 8 pm) to form two two-hour dog watches, with the "first" dog watch from 16:00 to 18:00 (4 pm to 6 pm) and the "second" or "last" dog watch from 18:00 to 20:00 (6 pm to 8 pm).

Need for a dog watch at sea
This watch exists because, in order for the crew to rotate through all the watches, it is necessary to have an odd number of watches in a ship's day.  Splitting one of the watches in half allows the sailors to stand different watches instead of one team being forced to stand the mid-watch every night. The choice of time also allows both watches, if there are only two, to eat an evening meal at about the traditional time.

Etymology 
The Oxford English Dictionary states that the word 'dogwatch' is a direct translation from either German or Dutch of a similar term. It originally referred to the night-watch on ships — that is, the time when (on land) all but the dogs were asleep. The name is also said to be derived from Sirius, the "Dog Star", on the claim that Sirius was the first star that can be seen at night. An alternative folk etymology is that the name arose because someone tasked with one of these 'half' watches was said to be 'dodging the watch', taking or standing the 'dodge watch'. This became shortened to 'dog watch'. Another variation is that those sleeping get only 'dog sleep' in this watch. Stephen Maturin of Patrick O'Brian's Aubrey–Maturin series retells the 19th century humourist Theodore Hook's pun that the dog watch is so-named because it is "cur-tailed" ("curtailed", i.e. shortened).

See also

 Ship's bell
 Watch system

References

Nautical terminology